This article shows all participating team squads at the 2010 Women's European Water Polo Championship, held in Croatia from 31 August to 10 September 2010.

Source

Source

Source

Source

Source

Source

Source

Source

References

Women
Women's European Water Polo Championship
European Water Polo Championship squads
Euro